Xinomavro (Greek: Ξινόμαυρο , lit. 'sour black') is the principal red wine grape of the uplands of Naousa in the regional unit of Imathia, and around Amyntaio, in Macedonia, Greece. This grape is primarily cultivated in Naousa, Goumenissa, Amyntaio, Rapsani, Trikomo, Siatista, Velventos, and, on a lesser scale, on Mount Athos, at Ossa, Ioannina, Magnesia, Kastoria and Trikala.

Wine regions

Red wine made from Xinomavro in the Naousa region has become one of Greece's most important and well regarded wines. The Naousa Protected Designation of Origin (PDO) was established in 1971 and mandates the use of 100% Xinomavro grapes. Good examples age well due to the wine's high acidity and tannin content, and can be similar enough to wines made from Nebbiolo grapes that comparisons are often made to Italy's highly regarded Barolo.
In Goumenissa the grape is often blended with Negoska to produce very fruity wines with high alcohol levels.

References

Red wine grape varieties
Imathia
Grape varieties of Greece